This is a list of articles in Eastern philosophy.

A 
 A. R. Natarajan
 Abd al-Karīm ibn Hawāzin al-Qushayri
 Abhidharma
 Abū Hayyān al-Tawhīdī
 Achintya Bheda Abheda
 Adi Shankara
 Adrsta
 Advaita Vedanta
 Ahankara
 Ahimsa
 Ahimsa in Jainism
 Ahmad Sirhindi
 Al-Farabi
 Al-Ghazali
 Al-Kindi
 Al-Shahrastani
 Alan Watts
 Alfonso Falero
 An Hyang
 Anāgāmi
 Analects
 Anandamaya kosha
 Anantarika-karma
 Anatta
 Anava
 Anekantavada
 Animals in Buddhism
 Antahkarana
 Aparoksanubhuti
 Aparokshanubhuti
 Arhat
 Arindam Chakrabarti
 Arya
 Asanga
 Ashtamangala
 Asian values
 Āstika and nāstika
 Ātman (Buddhism)
 Avadhuta Gita
 Averroes
 Avidyā (Buddhism)
 Avidya (Hinduism)
 Ayatana
 Ayyavazhi phenomenology

B 
 Bahshamiyya
 Bardo
 Barhaspatya sutras
 Basic Points Unifying the Theravāda and the Mahāyāna
 Bhagavad Gita
 Bhava
 Bhedabheda
 Bhumi (Buddhism)
 Bodhi
 Bodhimandala
 Bodhisattva Precepts
 Book of Changes
 Brahmacharya
 Brahman
 Brahmavihara
 Budaya
 Buddha-nature
 Buddhism and evolution
 Buddhist ethics
 Buddhist view of marriage

C 
 Cai Yuanpei
 Caigentan
 Carsun Chang
 Cārvāka
 Ch'ien Mu
 Chanakya
 Chandragomin
 Chao Cuo
 Chen Chung-hwan
 Chen Duxiu
 Chen Hongmou
 Cheng Hao
 Cheng Yi (philosopher)
 Chinese philosophy
 Chöd
 Choe Chung
 Chu Anping
 Chung-ying Cheng
 Chunyu Kun
 Confucian view of marriage
 Confucianism
 Confucianism in Indonesia
 Confucius

D 
 Dai Zhen
 David Wong (philosopher)
 Desire realm
 Dharani
 Dharma
 Dharma (Jainism)
 Dharma transmission
 Dharmakāya
 Dharmarāja Adhvarin
 Diamond Realm
 Dignāga
 Disciples of Confucius
 Doctrine of the Mean
 Dōgen
 Dong Zhongshu
 Dravya
 Dravya (Jainism)
 Dukkha
 Dvaita
 Dzogchen

E 
 Eastern epistemology
 Eastern philosophy
 Eastern philosophy and clinical psychology
 Eight Honors and Eight Shames
 Ekam
 Eternal Buddha

F 
 Fan Zhen
 Fazang
 Fazlur Rahman Malik
 Feng Youlan
 Fetter (Buddhism)
 Filial piety
 Fiqh
 Five hindrances
 Four stages of enlightenment
 Fourteen unanswerable questions
 Fujiwara Seika

G 
 Gangesha Upadhyaya
 Gaozi
 Gaudapada
 Ge Hong
 Genshin
 God in Buddhism
 Gongsun Long
 Great Learning
 Gu Yanwu
 Gu Zhun
 Guiguzi
 Guo Xiang
 Guru Nanak Dev

H 
 Hajime Tanabe
 Hakuin Ekaku
 Han Fei
 Han Yong-un
 Han Yu
 Hao Wang (academic)
 Haribhadra
 Hayashi Hōkō
 Hayashi Razan
 Hayashi Ryūkō
 Hinayana
 Hirata Atsutane
 Hōnen
 Hong Liangji
 Hong Zicheng
 Hosoi Heishu
 Hu Qiaomu
 Hu Shih
 Huan Tan
 Huang Zongxi
 Huangdi Sijing
 Huashu
 Huayan school
 Hui Shi
 Huineng
 Huiyuan (Buddhist)
 Human beings in Buddhism
 Hundred Schools of Thought

I 
 Ibn Arabi
 Identityism
 Ikeda Mitsumasa
 Impermanence
 Indriya
 Inka
 Ippen
 Itō Jinsai

J 
 Jaimini
 Jain cosmology
 Jainism
 Jawaharlal Nehru
 Jayanta Bhatta
 Jayarāśi Bhaṭṭa
 Jayatirtha
 Jia Yi
 Jiao Yu
 Jien
 Jin Yuelin
 Jing Fang
 Jinul
 Jiva Goswami
 Jizang
 Junzi

K 
 K. N. Jayatilleke
 Kaibara Ekken
 Kalpa (aeon)
 Kammaṭṭhāna
 Kanada
 Kancha Ilaiah
 Kang Youwei
 Karma
 Karma in Buddhism
 Karma in Jainism
 Karuṇā
 Keiji Nishitani
 Kensho
 Kevala Jnana
 Kitabatake Chikafusa
 Kosha
 Krishna Chandra Bhattacharya
 Kumārila Bhaṭṭa
 Kwon Geun

L 
 Lai Zhide
 Laozi
 Legalism (Chinese philosophy)
 LGBT topics and Confucianism
 Li (Confucian)
 Li (Neo-Confucianism)
 Li Ao
 Li Kui (legalist)
 Li Shenzhi
 Li Shicen
 Li Si
 Li Zhi (philosopher)
 Liang Qichao
 Liang Shuming
 Liezi
 Lin Yutang
 Lineage (Buddhism)
 Linji school
 List of Chinese philosophers
 List of Confucianists
 List of teachers of Advaita Vedanta
 Liu Boming
 Liu Bowen
 Logic in China
 Logic in Islamic philosophy
 Lu Ban
 Lu Jiuyuan
 Lü Liuliang
 Lunheng
 Luo Rufang

M 
 Ma Rong
 Macrocosm and microcosm
 Madhusūdana Sarasvatī
 Madhvacharya
 Madhyamaka
 Mahābhūta
 Mahamudra
 Mahavira
 Mahayana
 Manas-vijnana
 Mandala
 Maṇḍana Miśra
 Mao Zedong
 Mappō
 Masakazu Nakai
 Maya (illusion)
 Mayatita
 Mencius
 Mencius (book)
 Merit (Buddhism)
 Middle Way
 Mimāṃsā
 Mohandas Karamchand Gandhi
 Mohism
 Moksa (Jainism)
 Motoori Norinaga
 Mou Zongsan
 Mozi
 Muhammad Husayn Tabatabaei
 Muhammad ibn Zakariya al-Razi
 Muhammad Iqbal
 Mūlamadhyamakakārikā
 Mulla Sadra
 Myōe

N 
 Nagarjuna
 Namarupa
 Navya-Nyāya
 Neetham
 Neo-Confucianism
 Neti neti
 Nichiren
 Nimbarka
 Nirvana
 Nirvana (Jainism)
 Nishkam Karma
 Noble Eightfold Path
 Nondualism
 Nyaya
 Nyāya Sūtras

O 
 Ogyū Sorai
 Over-soul

P 
 Padmapadacharya
 Pan Pingge
 Paramartha
 Pāramitā
 Patañjali
 Periyar E. V. Ramasamy
 Philip Zhai
 Philosophy and Spiritualism of Sri Aurobindo
 Philosophy East and West
 Pirsig's metaphysics of Quality
 Prabhākara
 Pramana
 Pratītyasamutpāda
 Pratyekabuddha
 Prince Shōtoku
 Purva Mimamsa Sutras

Q 
 Qian Dehong
 Qin Hui (historian)
 Qingjing Jing
 Quantum mysticism

R 
 Rabia al-Adawiyya
 Rabindranath Tagore
 Raja Yoga
 Rajas
 Ramanuja
 Ratnatraya
 Reality in Buddhism
 Rebirth (Buddhism)
 René Guénon
 Rigpa

S 
 Sadvipras
 Saguna brahman
 Sakadagami
 Sambhogakāya
 Samkhyakarika
 Samkhyapravachana Sutra
 Saṃsāra
 Saṃsāra (Buddhism)
 Samsara (Jainism)
 Samvriti
 Sanjaya Belatthaputta
 Sanlun
 Sansara
 Śāntarakṣita
 Sarvepalli Radhakrishnan
 Sarye pyeollam
 Sat (Sanskrit)
 Sathya Sai Baba
 Satori
 Satya
 Sautrāntika
 Sayyid Qutb
 School of Names
 Sengzhao
 Seo Gyeong-deok
 Seosan
 Seven Factors of Enlightenment
 Shahab al-Din Suhrawardi
 Shang Yang
 Shao Yong
 Sharia
 Shastrartha
 Shen Buhai
 Shen Dao
 Shen Kuo
 Shenhui
 Shinran
 Shoshin
 Siddhanta
 Skandha
 Sotāpanna
 Spiritual materialism
 Sramanism
 Sri Aurobindo
 Su Song
 Sufi cosmology
 Sukhlal Sanghvi
 Sun Tzu
 Sun Yat-sen
 Śūnyatā
 Surendranath Dasgupta
 Sureśvara
 Suzuki Shōsan
 Swami Vivekananda
 Syādvāda

T 
 T'ai chi ch'uan philosophy
 Taiji (philosophy)
 Tamas (philosophy)
 Tan Sitong
 Tang Junyi
 Tang Zhen
 Tantraloka
 Tao
 Tao Te Ching
 Taoism
 Tathāgata
 Tathagatagarbha doctrine
 Tathātā/Dharmatā
 Tattva (Jainism)
 Ten spiritual realms
 The Literary Mind and the Carving of Dragons
 The Tao of Zen
 The Twenty-four Filial Exemplars
 Third eye
 Thirteen Classics
 Thome H. Fang
 Thoughtform
 Three marks of existence
 Threefold Training
 Ti (concept)
 Toju Nakae
 Tomonubu Imamichi
 Trailokya
 Trairūpya
 Trikaya
 Twelve Nidānas
 Two truths doctrine
 Types of Buddha

U 
 Udyotakara
 Upadhi
 Upanishads
 Upaya
 Upeksa
 Utpaladeva

V 
 Vācaspati Miśra
 Vagbhatananda Gurudevar
 Vallabha Acharya
 Vasubandhu
 Vijnanabhiksu
 Vipāka
 Vipassanā
 Vipassana movement
 Vishishtadvaita
 Vivekachudamani
 Vyasa
 Vyasatirtha

W 
 Wang Bi
 Wang Chong
 Wang Fu
 Wang Fuzhi
 Wang Ruoshui
 Wang Yangming
 Wen-tzu
 Wenzi
 Womb Realm
 Wonderism
 Wonhyo
 Woo Tsin-hang
 Works of Madhvacharya
 Wu Enyu
 Wu Qi
 Wuji (philosophy)

X 
 Xi Kang
 Ximen Bao
 Xiong Shili
 Xu Ai
 Xu Youyu
 Xuanxue
 Xuanzang
 Xun Zi

Y 
 Yamaga Sokō
 Yamazaki Ansai
 Yang Rongguo
 Yang Xiong (author)
 Yang Zhu
 Yasovijaya
 Ye Shi
 Yen Yuan
 Yi Hwang
 Yi I
 Yi Xing
 Yoga
 Yogacara
 Yong
 Yongjia School
 Yu Zhengxie
 Yuga
 Yunmen Wenyan
 Yuquan Shenxiu

Z 
 Zen and the Art of Motorcycle Maintenance
 Zengcius
 Zengzi
 Zhan Ruoshui
 Zhang Dongsun
 Zhang Guoxiang
 Zhang Heng
 Zhang Zai
 Zheng Xuan
 Zhenren
 Zhentong
 Zhi Dun
 Zhou Dunyi
 Zhou Guoping
 Zhu Qianzhi
 Zhu Xi
 Zhu Xueqin
 Zhuangzi
 Zhuangzi (book)
 Zi Chan
 Zisi
 Zou Yan

Eastern